Eduardo João Bunga, better known as Josué (born July 17, 2000) is an Angolan international footballer. He currently plays for Kabuscorp S.C.P. in the Angolan league, the Girabola.

He made his international debut for Angola at the age of 15 in a 3-0 loss against Malawi at the 2016 COSAFA Cup.

References 

Angolan footballers
Angola international footballers
2000 births
Association football goalkeepers
Kabuscorp S.C.P. players
Living people